"Woke Up in Love" is a song written by J.P. Pennington, and recorded by American country music group Exile.  It was released in November 1983 as the second single from the album Exile.  The song was Exile's second country hit and the first of ten number one singles on the country chart.  The single went to number one for one week and spent a total of twelve weeks on the country chart.

Background
Exile had been performing since the mid-1960s, both as a touring and recording act. After adopting a pop-rock style in the early 1970s, the group reached the peak of its success in 1978 with the song "Kiss You All Over"; that song spent four weeks at No. 1 on the Billboard Hot 100. Subsequent singles fared far less successfully.

In the early 1980s, with Les Taylor replacing the departed Jimmy Stokley as lead singer, Exile began a transition to country music, with elements of strong Southern rock flavor. In 1983, the newly revamped group released its first country chart single, "High Cost Of Leaving," which reached No. 27 on the Hot Country Singles chart that summer. That paved the way for "Woke Up In Love," which reached No. 1 in the late winter of 1984 and began a string of 10 No. 1 songs on the Hot Country Singles chart, the first seven of them in as many single releases.

Charts

Weekly charts

Year-end charts

References

1984 singles
Exile (American band) songs
Songs written by J.P. Pennington
Song recordings produced by Buddy Killen
Epic Records singles
1983 songs